Gin is the name of:

Gin people, a Việt Kinh group
Gin Chow (1857–1933), Chinese immigrant who gained fame in California as a prophet and fortune teller
Gin Wigmore (born 1986), New Zealand singer songwriter
Madeline Gins (1941–2014), American artist, architect, and poet
 Gin (Case Closed), a member of the Black Organization in Case Closed

Characters 
Gin (pronounced with a hard G) is also the name of the following Japanese fictional characters:
 Gin Ichimaru, a character in Bleach
 Ghin (One Piece), a character in One Piece
 Gin, a character in Hotarubi no Mori e
 A fictional Akita Inu bear-hunting dog in Ginga: Nagareboshi Gin and Ginga Densetsu Weed
 Gintoki Sakata, a character in Gintama
 Suigintou, a character in Rozen Maiden
 Gin Ibushi, a character in Kimi ga Shine
 Minowa Gin, one of the three main characters of Washio Sumi is a Hero.

Japanese masculine given names